Chubineh (also Romanized as Chūbīneh; also known as Chouina and Chu Bīna) is a village in Horr Rural District, Dinavar District, Sahneh County, Kermanshah Province, Iran. At the 2006 census, its population was 304, in 77 families.

References 

Populated places in Sahneh County